Switzerland competed in the Eurovision Song Contest 2008 with the song "Era stupendo" by Paolo Meneguzzi. Meneguzzi was chosen by the Swiss national broadcaster, SRG SSR idée suisse, to sing for Switzerland in Belgrade, Serbia. For 2008, SRG SSR idée suisse had continued to internally select the song and singer to represent Switzerland at the 2008 contest, with an open call for songs being held by the broadcaster.

Many artists announced their intention to submit songs to the Swiss broadcaster in the hope of representing Switzerland in the Eurovision Song Contest 2008. Paolo Meneguzzi was selected by the broadcaster to perform for Switzerland with his Italian ballad "Era stupendo".

Background 

The nation is noted for having won the first contest in 1956 with the song "Refrain" performed by Lys Assia. In , the internal selection of Estonian girl band Vanilla Ninja, performing the song "Cool Vibes", qualified Switzerland to the final where they placed 8th. Switzerland did not manage to make it to the final in 2007.

The Swiss national broadcaster, SRG SSR idée suisse, broadcasts the event within Switzerland and organises the selection process for the nation's entry.

Before Eurovision

Internal selection 

SRG SSR idée suisse opened a submission period between 20 July 2007 and 22 October 2007 for interested artists and composers to submit their entries. Eligible artists were those that have had television and stage experience (live performances), have made at least one video and have released at least one CD which placed among the top 50 in an official chart. In addition to the public submission, the broadcaster was also in contact with individual composers and lyricists as well as the music industry to be involved in the selection process. 

On 25 November 2007, Swiss newspaper Blick claimed that "Era stupendo" performed by Paolo Meneguzzi would be the Swiss entry for the Eurovision Song Contest 2008, which was subsequently confirmed by SRG SSR idée suisse on the same day. Both the artist and song were selected by a jury panel consisting of representatives of the three broadcasters in Switzerland: the Swiss-German broadcaster Schweizer Fernsehen (SF), the Swiss-French broadcaster Télévision Suisse Romande (TSR) and the Swiss-Italian broadcaster Televisione svizzera di lingua italiana (TSI), as well as the radio station from SF Schweizer Radio DRS and the music channel VIVA Switzerland. Among the artists that submitted a song included Gimma, Jürgen Drews and Peach Weber. In regards to his selection as the Swiss entrant, Meneguzzi stated: "I'm very happy and honoured to represent my homeland at Eurovision 2008. I'm anxious to go to the stage and to perform my song. I hope to meet new friends, new fans from many different nationalities who will vote for me and many new feelings we'll live together. [...] See all of you in Belgrade!". 

"Era stupendo", which was written by Paolo Meneguzzi together with Mattias Brånn and Vincenzo Incenzo, was presented to the public on 12 January 2008 during the annual SwissAward show broadcast on SF1, TSR 2 and TSI 2. The official music video of the song was released on 18 March 2008.

Controversy 
After the release of the song, there was speculation that "Era stupendo" was a plagiarism of "It Can Only Get Better" by Swedish singer Amy Diamond who was competing in the 2008 Swedish national final Melodifestivalen 2008. Accusations arose that the beginnings of both songs were too similar to be a coincidence, however the song was not disqualified by the European Broadcasting Union (EBU), the organiser of the contest.

Promotion

Promoting his song, Meneguzzi appeared on a Eurovision TV special on Maltese television in April 2008. A CD single featuring the song was published, which peaked at number 11 on the Swiss Singles Chart in June 2008.

At Eurovision
The Eurovision Song Contest 2008 took place at the Belgrade Arena in Belgrade, Serbia. It consisted of two semi-finals held on 20 and 22 May, respectively, and the final on 24 May 2008.
On 28 January 2008, an allocation draw was held that placed each country into one of the two semi-finals, with Switzerland being placed into the second semi-final. The 2008 contest was the first to feature two semi-finals, a change intended to reduce the problems of neighbourly and diaspora voting that occurred in years past. Countries that normally would vote for each other were placed into separate semi-finals.

The commentators at the event were Sven Epiney for SF, Sandy Altermatt for RTSI, and Jean-Marc Richard and Nicolas Tanner for TSR. The spokesperson for Switzerland, announcing the results of the Swiss televote for the contest, was Cécile Bähler.

Semi-final

Meneguzzi sang in the second semi-final on 22 May 2008, performing 7th on the night. His performance included him wearing a black suit with a black shirt, and included two male and two female backing dancers and singers; the women dressed in black dresses with silver gloves, and the men in black shirts and black trousers. A pianist was also present on stage, dressed in a white shirt and black tie. The song began with Meneguzzi singing solo in the centre of the stage, with the back-up dancers surrounding the piano. As the song sped up, the dancers moved to behind Meneguzzi and began to sing. The performance included the use of pyrotechnics when the song sped up, as well as during the bridge. Despite being a fan favourite the song only managed to receive 47 points, placing 13th in a field of 19 and failing to qualify for the final.

Voting
Below is a breakdown of points awarded to Switzerland in the second semi-final of the Eurovision Song Contest 2008, as well as by the country in the semi-final and final. Meneguzzi's performance received 47 points, placing the nation 13th of the 19 entries and not qualifying for the final.

Points awarded to Switzerland

Points awarded by Switzerland

References

2008
Countries in the Eurovision Song Contest 2008
Eurovision